Zhang Ze was the defending champion but chose not to defend his title.

Jason Jung won the title after defeating Dominik Köpfer 6–4, 2–6, 7–6(7–5) in the final.

Seeds

Draw

Finals

Top half

Bottom half

References
Main Draw
Qualifying Draw

Kunal Patel San Francisco Open - Singles